Double Feature (A Ballet in Two Acts) was choreographed by Susan Stroman for the New York City Ballet to music by Irving Berlin and Walter Donaldson. The libretto is by Ms. Stroman and Glen Kelly, with orchestrations by Doug Besterman and arrangement by Mr. Kelly; the libretto for "Makin' Whoopee!" is based on the play Seven Chances, variously attributed to Roi Cooper Megris and David Belasco. The premiere took place on 23 January 2004 at the New York State Theater, Lincoln Center, with scenery by Robin Wagner, costumes by William Ivey Long, and lighting by Mark Stanley.

The Blue Necklace

Music: Irving Berlin 

   
Alexander's Ragtime Band
Always, What'll I Do?
How About Me?
Slumming on Park Avenue
Let Yourself Go
Everybody's Doin' It Now
 
All Alone
The Best Things Happen While You're Dancing
Mandy
Steppin' Out with My Baby
You're Easy to Dance With
No Strings
How Deep is the Ocean

Blue Necklace original cast 

   
Maria Kowroski
Kyra Nichols
Ashley Bouder
Megan Fairchild 
 
Jason Fowler
Damian Woetzel

Makin' Whoopee

Music: Walter Donaldson 

   
Makin' Whoopee!
My Baby Just Cares for Me
Borneo
Reaching for Someone
My Buddy
My Blue Heaven
 
The Daughter of Rosie O'Grady
He's the Last Word
You
Romance
Love Me or Leave Me
Yes Sir! That's My Baby
Carolina in the Morning

Makin' Whoopee original cast 

   
Alexandra Ansanelli
 
Tom Gold
Albert Evans
Arch Higgins
Seth Orza

References 

 

Playbill, New York City Ballet, Tuesday, May 20, 2008

Repertory Week, New York City Ballet, Spring Season, 2008 repertory, week 4

Articles 

  
NY Times by Jennifer Dunning, September 9, 2007
 
NY Times by Jack Anderson, January 27, 2008
NY Times by Matthew Gurewitsch, January 18, 2004

Reviews 

  
NY Times by Anna Kisselgoff, January 26, 2004
NY Times, John Rockwell, February 21, 2005 
 
NY Times, Jack Anderson, February 26, 2005 
NY Times, Jennifer Dunning, February 2, 2008 

Ballets by Susan Stroman
Ballets to the music of Irving Berlin
Ballets to the music of Walter Donaldson
Ballets designed by William Ivey Long
2004 ballet premieres
Ballets designed by Robin Wagner
New York City Ballet repertory